Cortana is a fossil genus of medium-sized air-breathing land snails, terrestrial pulmonate gastropods in the family Bulimulidae. The genus is known only from the Brazilian Paleocene deposits of the Itaboraí Basin, in the state of Rio de Janeiro. The most characteristic feature of the genus is its apertural armature.

Etymology 
The etymology is explained in "Taxonomic revision of the fossil pulmonate mollusks of Itaboraí Basin (Paleocene), Brazil" as "Etymology: The name was taken from a character of the science fiction franchise "Halo", and alludes to the convoluted markings on the shell surface of the holotype of Cortana carvalhoi. Grammatical gender: feminine."

Species 
The sole species in the genus is Cortana carvalhoi (Brito, 1967).

References 

Bulimulidae
Paleocene gastropods
Molluscs of South America
Monotypic gastropod genera
Prehistoric gastropod genera